Prairie Public Broadcasting is a community-owned public broadcaster based in North Dakota, Minnesota, and Montana, with coverage extending into South Dakota, Saskatchewan, Manitoba, and Northwestern Ontario.  It operates Prairie Public Radio, a radio network; and Prairie Public Television, a television network.

 
American radio networks
NPR member networks
PBS member networks